Treweek is a surname of British origin. It may refer to:

Athanasius Treweek (1911–1995), Australian linguist
Bernie Treweek (1914–1957), Australian football player
George Treweek (1905–1991), Australian rugby league player
Hazel Treweek (1919–2005), Australian educator
Rachel Treweek (born 1963), British bishop

English-language surnames